The 1615 Arica earthquake was a major earthquake centered near Arica in the Spanish colonial Viceroyalty of Peru, within the present day Arica y Parinacota Region of northwestern Chile.

The earthquake caused considerable damage to the infrastructure of the city with the Iglesia Mayor. The city's fort collapsed, and cracks opened in the floor of the royal quicksilver storage facility. No human was reported dead but three people suffered injuries.

References

1615 Arica earthquake
1615 earthquakes
1615 in the Captaincy General of Chile
1610s in Peru
History of Arica y Parinacota Region
Viceroyalty of Peru